Me and My Pal is a 1939 British comedy film directed by Thomas Bentley and starring Dave Willis, Pat Kirkwood and George Moon. The screenplay concerns two lorry drivers who become mixed up with criminals who trick them into an insurance swindle that ends up with them being sent to prison.

It was the second and last feature film made by Willis who had also appeared with Kirkwood in the 1938 comedy film Save a Little Sunshine. It was made at Welwyn Studios.

Cast
 Dave Willis – Dave Craig
 Pat Kirkwood – Peggy
 George Moon – Hal Thommson
 A. Giovanni – Giovanni
 John Warwick – Charlie
 Arthur Margetson – Andrews
 Aubrey Mallalieu – Prison governor
 Eliot Makeham – Cripps
 O. B. Clarence – Judge
 Ernest Butcher – Webb
 Hugh Dempster – Joe
 Gerry Fitzgerald – Singing convict
 Ian Fleming – Doctor Russell
 Agnes Lauchlan – Mrs. Blocksom

References

External links

1939 films
1939 comedy films
British comedy films
Films directed by Thomas Bentley
1930s English-language films
Films set in England
Films shot at Welwyn Studios
British black-and-white films
1930s British films